Humor theory may refer to:
Theory of humor, explanations of what humor is
Humorism, a theory in ancient Greek and Roman medicine that there are four bodily fluids: black bile, yellow bile, phlegm, and blood